UBE or Ube may refer to:

 Ubiquitin-activating enzyme
 Ube, Yamaguchi, a city in Japan
 Uniform Bar Examination
 Unilateral Biportal Endoscopy
 Ube Industries, chemical company
 Union bound estimate, a probability theory bound
 Union of Bookmakers Employees
 United Bank of Egypt, a bank co-owned by Banque du Caire
 Unbiennium, an undiscovered superactinide chemical element
 Universal Basic Education, education system in Nigeria
 Universal Basic Employment, a form of social program for ensuring employment through a society's needs
 Unrecoverable bit error rate, a media assessment measure related to the hard disk drive storage technology
 Unsolicited bulk email, a type of email spam
 Upper Black Eddy, Pennsylvania, an unincorporated village in the United States
 Ube (Dioscorea alata), also known as the purple yam, a species of edible yams
 Ube halaya, a Philippine dessert made from boiled and mashed purple yam
 Upper body ergometer, a type of exercise equipment